Hazel Creek is a stream in southwest Washington County in the U.S. state of Missouri. It is a tributary of Courtois Creek. Hazel Creek lies within the Mark Twain National Forest and the community of Palmer and the Hazel Creek Recreation Area are within the stream valley.
 
Hazel Creek most likely was named on account of hazel trees near its course.

See also
List of rivers of Missouri

References

Rivers of Washington County, Missouri
Rivers of Missouri